Jingchuan County is county under jurisdiction of the prefecture-level city of Pingliang, in the east of Gansu Province, China, bordering Shaanxi Province to the southeast. It has a land area of 1,486 square kilometers. The county is named after the Jing River. In 2020 it had a population of 356,200, over 300,000 of whom in the rural area.

History

Under the name Jingzhou, Jingchuan was formerly the seat of Gansu's Jing Prefecture. The site of former Jingzhou is near the county seat of Jingchuan. The ancient city was built starting in the period of the Western Han Dynasty and abandoned in the early Ming Dynasty. Parts of the old city are still preserved.

During the Republic of China (1912–1949) period it was renamed from Jing County to Jingchuan to avoid confusion with Anhui's Jing County which shared the same name.

Since 1983, Jingchuan has been a model county for reforestation of the Loess Plateau. It is a key county in the Three-North Shelter Forest Program.

Economy 
Jingchuan is a large producer of apples, in 2015 it cultivated 400,000 tons of fruit, mostly Fuji apples. Other agricultural produce includes carrots, cabbage, and persimmon.

Administrative divisions
Jingchuan County is divided to 1 subdistrict, 11 towns, 3 townships and 1 other. The seat of government is Chengguan Town. 
Subdistricts
 Chengshishequ

Towns

-Towns are upgraded from Township.

Townships
 Luohandong Township()
 Jingming Township()
 Honghe Township

Others
 Zhanglaosi Farm()

Climate

Transport
China National Highway 312
G22 Qingdao–Lanzhou Expressway
Xi'an–Pingliang railway

References

External links
Official website of Jingchuan County

County-level divisions of Gansu
Pingliang